Jabhatul Islamiya (JABISO) also known as the Somali Islamic Front (SIF) was an Islamist insurgent group in Somalia. The group participated in the 2006-2009 insurgency against Ethiopia and in January 2009 merged with the Asmara based wing of the Alliance for the Re-liberation of Somalia, led by Sheikh Hassan Dahir Aweys, the Ras Kamboni Brigade, led by Sheikh Hassan Abdullah Hersi al-Turki and a smaller group Mu'askar Anole to form Hizbul Islam which became the second most powerful insurgent group (after al-Shabaab) in Somalia which continued fighting the TFG and AMISOM peacekeepers, after Ethiopian withdrawal.

On 19 January 2009, Jabhatul Islamiya fought a battle over the police headquarters of Mogadishu's Dharkinley district with the Somali government which killed at least 2 people. Jabhatul Islamiya had seized the police station a week earlier but was overpowered and forced to withdraw. Later in the day however they received re-enforcements and managed to re-take control over the police station.

References

Factions in the Somali Civil War
Rebel groups in Somalia
Islamic political organizations
Guerrilla organizations
Islamist groups
Jihadist groups
Organizations based in Africa designated as terrorist
2007 establishments in Somalia
2009 disestablishments in Somalia
Somalia War (2006–2009)